Liezl Linda van der Merwe (born 5 October 1980) is a South African politician who serves as a Member of the National Assembly of South Africa, representing the Inkatha Freedom Party (IFP). She became an MP in May 2012.

Life and career
Van der Merwe was born in Goodwood, Cape Town. She attended Panorama Primary School and graduated from Paarl Gimnasium. While at school, she took an interest in politics. She later obtained a Diploma in Journalism.

She moved to London and worked for broadcaster ITV. After returning to South Africa, she became a member of the IFP. Within the IFP, she serves as the party's Director of Communications and is a member of IFP National Council. She is also a former member of the party's National Youth Brigade and a present member of the party's Women's Brigade.

Van der Merwe became a parliamentarian in May 2012. She was sworn in alongside IFP spokesperson Mkhuleko Hlengwa. She was elected to her first full term in May 2014 and won another term in May 2019.

References

External links
Ms Liezl Linda Van Der Merwe – Parliament of South Africa

Living people
Inkatha Freedom Party politicians
Members of the National Assembly of South Africa
Alumni of Paarl Gimnasium
Afrikaner people
People from Cape Town
Women members of the National Assembly of South Africa
1980 births